Pogonishte is a folk dance from Pogon in southern Albania. It is related to the Greek dance Pogonisios or Sta Dyo.

References

Albanian folk dances
Circle dances